Wete is a town located on the Tanzanian island of Pemba. It is the capital of Pemba North Region, as well as the administrative seat for Wete District. It lies on the west side of the north part of the island. The town has a 2013 estimated population of 29,606.

To the southwest of Wete Harbour, about a kilometre away, is the small island of Matambwe, site of Shirazi ruins of a medieval town.

The harbor at Wete was a major port-of-entry for Pemba; however, in recent years it has been mostly superseded by Mkoani.

Climate
Wete has a tropical climate, milder than Tanzania's mainland or Unguja island. This climate is classified as a tropical monsoon climate (Am) by the Köppen system. There are two rainy seasons, with most rainfall coming between March and June and smaller rain season occurring between November and December. Drier months are January and February, plus a longer drier season between July and October.

Sports
The wete is home to football clubs Jamhuri and Mwenge.

References

Cities in Zanzibar
Pemba Island
Pemba North Region
Regional capitals in Tanzania